The Roman Catholic Mission sui iuris of the Cayman Islands is a mission sui iuris of the Latin Church of the Roman Catholic Church in the Caribbean.

The mission comprises the entirety of the British dependency of the Cayman Islands and consists of five parishes, including Saint Ignatius in George Town, Christ The Redeemer Church in West Bay and Stella Maris Church on Cayman Brac.

The independent mission is exceptionally not exempt (directly dependent on the Holy See) but a suffragan in the ecclesiastical province of the Metropolitan Archdiocese of Kingston in Jamaica, and a member of the Antilles Episcopal Conference, while held in personal union with the Metropolitan see of Detroit (Michigan, USA).

History 
The mission was erected on 14 July 2000 on territory split off from the Archdiocese of Kingston in Jamaica, its Metropolitan.

Ordinaries

Ecclesiastical Superior of Cayman Island
 Cardinal Adam Joseph Maida (2000-2009)
 Allen Henry Vigneron (2009-present)

Relationship with Detroit 
In November 2000, the Roman Catholic Archdiocese of Detroit was assigned pastoral responsibility for the Roman Catholic Church of the Cayman Islands,  The Mission and the Archdiocese are related in the person of Mission Ordinary Archbishop Vigneron, who is the current Archbishop of Detroit.

References

Sources and external links
 GCatholic 

Roman Catholic Church in the Cayman Islands
Missions sui iuris
Roman Catholic dioceses in the Caribbean
Roman Catholic Ecclesiastical Province of Kingston in Jamaica